Gaguik Oganessian (21 April 1947 – 2015) was an Armenian chess player, chess official, journalist and writer. Born in Yerevan, he was awarded the title of FIDE International Organizer in 1996 and served as president of FIDE Zone 1.5, chairman of FIDE Chess Information, Publication and Statistics Committee (CHIPS), member of the FIDE Executive Board, general secretary of the Armenian Chess Federation. Oganessian won the 4th World Amateur Chess Championship, held along the 1998/99 Hastings International Chess Congress, and as a result he was awarded the title FIDE Master.

Oganessian graduated from the Journalism Department of the Philological Faculty of Yerevan State University in 1968. Three years later, he became associate professor at the same department. In 1972, Oganessian founded the magazine Chess in Armenia, of which he was also editor-in-chief. He was author of 51 chess books.

In 2007 then-president of Armenia Robert Kocharian handed him a Governmental Award. In the same year Kirsan Ilyumzhinov rewarded him with FIDE Golden Sign for the "feverish activity in the chess field."

Oganessian died in June 2015.

References

External links
Gagik Hovhannisyan at Public TV Company
Gaguik Oganessian - Articles - New In Chess

1947 births
2015 deaths
Armenian chess players
Chess FIDE Masters
Chess writers
Chess officials
Sportspeople from Yerevan
Writers from Yerevan
Yerevan State University alumni
Date of death missing